Tanggula North railway station  is a station on the Chinese Qinghai–Tibet Railway, a railway connecting Xining to Lhasa.

See also
 List of highest railway stations in the world
 Qinghai–Tibet Railway
 List of stations on Qinghai–Tibet railway

Railway stations in Qinghai
Stations on the Qinghai–Tibet Railway